Deogratias Muganwa Byabazaire (9 October 1941 – 8 February 2014), was a Roman Catholic priest who served as Bishop of the Roman Catholic Diocese of Hoima, from 21 May 1990 until 8 February 2014.

Background and priesthood
Byabazaire was born on 9 October 1941, in a neighborhood called Karujubu, in the city of Masindi, in Masindi District, in the Bunyoro sub-region, in the Western Region of Uganda. He was ordained to the priesthood at Hoima on 9 August 1969 and served as priest in Hoima Diocese until 21 May 1990.

As bishop
On 21 May 1990, Byabazaire was appointed coadjutor bishop of the Roman Catholic Diocese of Hoima. He was ordained bishop on 18 August 1990 by Archbishop Luis Robles Díaz†, Titular Archbishop of Stephaniacum, assisted by Archbishop Emmanuel Wamala,
Archbishop of Kampala Archdiocese and Bishop Albert Edward Baharagate, Bishop of Hoima.

On 9 March 1991, Byabazaire succeeded as diocesan bishop, following the resignation of Bishop Albert Edward Baharagate. Bishop Byabazaire died in office on 8 February 2014, at the age of 72 years and four months. He is buried at Bujumbura Cathedral, in the city of Hoima, the seat of Hoima Catholic Diocese.

See also
 Catholic Church in Uganda
 Uganda Martyrs

Succession table

References

External links
 Profile of Roman Catholic Diocese of Hoima

1941 births
2014 deaths
20th-century Roman Catholic bishops in Uganda
21st-century Roman Catholic bishops in Uganda
Roman Catholic bishops of Hoima